Looe railway station serves the twin towns of East and West Looe, in Cornwall, England. It faces out across the estuary of the River Looe.

History 
The Liskeard and Looe Railway was opened on 27 December 1860 to carry goods traffic; passenger trains started (and Looe station opened) on 11 September 1879.  The railway in those days connected with the Liskeard and Caradon Railway at Moorswater, the loop line from Coombe Junction to Liskeard railway station not opening until 25 February 1901 (goods) and 15 May 1901 (passenger).

The station was unusual for a terminus, in that there was just a single platform and track, with no loop for the locomotive to run round to the back of the train for the return journey.  Instead, all trains continued empty to the carriage shed and engine shed that was situated between the platform and the road bridge across the river.  Goods sidings were provided between these sheds and the river, but much of the goods traffic was destined for Buller Quay beyond the approach to the bridge.

Looe signal box was situated in a hut on the platform.  It only had eight levers and was closed on 15 March 1964, after which the section to Coombe Junction was controlled by issuing the train driver with a distinct wooden staff.

The Looe branch, like most Cornish branch-lines, was proposed for closure in the 1963 Beeching Report. The sidings beyond the station were taken out of use in November 1963 and the line cut back by 110 yards on 28 April 1968; the police station now stands where the railway station building and most of the platform once was (the current platform is the top end of the original one).  The zero milepost was situated near the seven-span road bridge across the river where the railway connected with the private sidings on Buller Quay.  The original station was 14 chains (252 yards or 231 m) north of this point, but the line has since been further shortened, so the mile post marking ¼ mile from the 'end' of the line is in fact opposite the platform and just 20 yards from the present stop block.

Facilities 
There is a single platform, on the left of trains arriving from Liskeard. There is a small waiting area and benches, as well as an information point on the platform. There are no ticket purchase facilities, so passengers buy tickets in advance or from the guard on the train.

Services 
All trains run to Liskeard along the "Looe Valley Line". In the May 2016 timetable, there were 12 departures on weekdays and winter Saturdays, 13 on summer Saturdays and 7 on summer Sundays. There is no Sunday service in the winter. Some services run directly to Liskeard, without any advertised stop at the intermediate stations.

Community rail 
The railway between Liskeard and Looe is designated as a community rail line and is supported by marketing provided by the Devon and Cornwall Rail Partnership.  The line is promoted under the "Looe Valley Line" name. The "Globe Inn" opposite the station is included in the Looe Valley Line rail ale trail, along with seven other pubs in East and West Looe.

Under its Looe Valley Railway Company trading arm, the Devon and Cornwall Rail Partnership has run a Summer ticket office at Looe station since 2004.

The Partnership ran a project celebrating the history and heritage of the Looe Valley Line in 2019.

Notes

References 

 
 
 
 
 
 
 

Railway stations in Cornwall
Former Liskeard and Looe Railway stations
Railway stations in Great Britain opened in 1879
Railway stations served by Great Western Railway
Looe
DfT Category F1 stations

de:Looe Valley Line#Bahnhof Looe